The 1977 North Carolina Tar Heels football team represented the North Carolina Tar Heels of University of North Carolina at Chapel Hill during the 1977 NCAA Division I football season.

Schedule

Roster
RB Amos Lawrence, Fr.

Season summary

at Virginia
Amos Lawrence 286 rush yards

References

North Carolina
North Carolina Tar Heels football seasons
Atlantic Coast Conference football champion seasons
North Carolina Tar Heels football